Rovine may refer to:

Battle of Rovine (1395)
Rovine, Gradiška, in Bosnia and Herzegovina
Rovine, Ivanjica, in Serbia
Rovine, a village in the municipality Craiova in Romania
Rovine, a village in the commune Reviga in Romania
Rovine, a tributary of the Bistra in Bihor County, Romania